Marshall Stedman (August 16, 1874 – December 16, 1943) was an American stage and silent screen actor/director, playwright, author and drama teacher.

Early life
Edward Marshall Stedman Jr. was born in Bethel, Maine, the son of Edward Sr. and Eliza Putnam (née Rice) Stedman. His father was a decorated naval officer who at the time of his death in 1939 had been the oldest surviving graduate of the United States Naval Academy and one of only three retired naval officers who saw service during the American Civil War.  Stedman received his early education in Chicago at South Division High School and the Harvard Preparatory School before attending Colorado College in Colorado Springs.

Career
Stedman began his theater career at around the age of eighteen with William Morris’ stock company playing Bob Appleton in   Ludwig Fulda’s three-act drama The Lost Paradise, and Ned Annesley in Sowing the Wind, a four-act play by Sydney Grundy. He later joined E. H. Sothern for two seasons and went on to star in a number of one-act plays and tour in Shakespearean repertoire productions.

For some years around 1900 Stedman lived in Gilpin County, Colorado with his father, sister Agnes, grandmother Miriam, uncle Josiah Stedman and later his wife Myrtle. News reports of the day indicated his family was involved in a mining venture near America City called the Charlemagne Lode.

In 1906, Stedman was named head of the drama school at the Chicago Musical College, a position he would hold for some four years. Later he spent a season in vaudeville before venturing into film work as a director with Essanay Studios and later the Selig Polyscope Company, as an actor, director, writer and producer. Several years later Stedman returned to teaching as a drama instructor with the Eagan School of Drama and Music in Los Angeles.

In the years that followed, Marshall Stedman would continue to teach, act and write. He played a number of villain roles in films made by Hobart Bosworth and returned to the stage in community theater productions performed by his students, often in plays he wrote. In the late 1920s Stedman founded the Marshall Stedman School of Drama and Elocution in Culver City, California.

Marriage
On January 13, 1900, Marshall Stedman married in Chicago Myrtle C. Lincoln, a young actress not yet seventeen. Lincoln Stedman, their only child, was born in 1907 and would go on to have his own career in Hollywood. Stedman and his wife separated around 1919 and a divorce soon followed. He later married Rieka Kulaars, a native of The Netherlands.

Death
Marshall Stedman died at the age of 69 on December 16, 1943, in Laguna Beach. He was survived by his son Lincoln who would die himself before the close of the decade.

Selected works

What a Kiss Can Do: And Other Recitations for Children, 1925
Readings and Encores for Children and Grown-Ups, 1926
Readings and Sketches for Boys, 1927
Monologues, Distinctive and Different, 1927
Samanthy's Suitors: A Character Sketch for a Lady, 1928
 Clever Monologues, 1928
Sure-Fire Monologues, 1928
Loving Lunatics: A Farce Comedy in One Act, 1929
 The Missionary to Zulu Land: A Farce Comedy on One Act, 1929
Tonic: A farce in One Act, 1929
 Out of the Storm: A play in One Act for Two Women, 1929
 Unique Monologues and Recitations for Children, 1929
Mr. Santa Claus: A Play in One Act, 1930
Marshall Stedman's New Book of Readings and Monologues, 1931
 Speakin' Day: A Comedy of School Days in One Act, 1931
A Shot in The Dark: A Comedy Mystery-Drama in One Act, 1931
The Bloom of Youth: A Farce Comedy in One Act for Three Women, 1931
The Hoodooed Hindu: A Farce Comedy in One Act, 1931
 Readings and Recitations for Special Days, 1931
Fifty-Fifty: A Comedy Drama in One Act, 1931
 Clever Sketches for Short Casts, 1932
Twelve Little Plays for Two Little Players, 1932
The Old Bachelor's Christmas: A Dramatic Reading (Banner plays), 1932
Stedman's Readings and Monologues for Children: A Collection of Forty-Eight Readings, Monologues, Recitations, Encores, Play-O-Logues and Novelty Acts, 1932
 Thirty-Two Readings, Monologues and Play-O-Logues for Grown-Ups, 1934
Amusing Monologues, 1940
 Eight Two Character Stunt Plays, 1946

External links
Myrtle and Marshall Stedman pose on skis near the mining town of American City (Gilpin County), April 1, 1900 Denver Public Library Digital Collection

Sources

1874 births
1943 deaths
American male silent film actors
Silent film directors
19th-century American male actors
American male stage actors
20th-century American male actors